This is a list of Togolese writers.

 Jeannette D. Ahonsou (born 1954), novelist
 Gad Ami (born 1958), novelist
 David Ananou (1917–2000), novelist
 Félix Couchoro (1900–1968), novelist, also connected with Benin 
 Richard Dogbeh, also connected with Benin, Senegal and Côte d'Ivoire (1932–2003), novelist and educator
 Kossi Efoui (born 1962), playwright
 Christiane Akoua Ekue (born 1954), French-language novelist
 Pyabelo Chaold Kouly (born 1943), autobiographical writer and novelist
 Tété-Michel Kpomassie (born 1941), explorer and writer
Farida Nabourema (born 1990), human rights activist, writer and blogger
 Stanislas Ocloo (died 2010), journalist
 Senouvo Agbota Zinsou (born 1946), playwright and short story writer

See also
List of African writers by country

References

Togolese
Writers